Griffioen is a Dutch surname meaning "griffin". The name is thought to derive from a house with the sign of a griffin or a coat of arms, though in the middle ages "Griffoen" was also in use as a given name. People with the surname include:

 Annemiek Griffioen (born 1979), Dutch football midfielder and coach
 James D. Griffioen (born 1977), American writer and photographer 
 Jiske Griffioen (born 1985), Dutch wheelchair tennis player
 Sander Griffioen (born 1941), Dutch philosopher

See also
128177 Griffioen, a main belt asteroid named after Roger Griffioen (born 1934), physicist

Dutch-language surnames